Abder Ramdane (born 23 February 1974) is a football manager and former player who played as a forward.

International career
Born in France, Ramdane chose to represent the Algeria national team, being selected for the squad for one match; however, he did not participate in the game.

Coaching career
Ramdane was employed together with his father-in-law Ewald Lienen as assistant coach and U-19 coach by Greek club Panionios F.C., from 2006 until 2008. He held the same position previously at German side Borussia Mönchengladbach. They joined TSV 1860 Munich on 13 May 2009. In June 2010, both moved to Olympiacos where they stayed only for some weeks. 

In November 2010, Lienen took over as coach of Arminia Bielefeld and Ramdane followed as assistant. Both left Bielefeld when they were relegated at the end of the season. In November 2013 he and Lienen were appointed by Romanian club Oțelul Galați as assistant coach and coach respectively.

In June 2018, Ramdane was appointed assistant coach to Luka Elsner at Belgian club Royale Union Saint-Gilloise. In the following year, he followed Elsner to French club Amiens SC. Ramdane left Armiens with Elsner at the end of September 2020.

Honours
SC Freiburg
 2. Bundesliga: 2002–03

Nîmes
 Coupe de France: finalist 1995–96

References

Living people
1974 births
French sportspeople of Algerian descent
French footballers
Footballers from Nîmes
Association football forwards
Algerian footballers
FC Hansa Rostock players
Nîmes Olympique players
SC Freiburg players
Le Havre AC players
Ligue 1 players
Bundesliga players
2. Bundesliga players
Expatriate footballers in Germany
Algerian expatriate sportspeople in Romania
Algerian expatriates in Germany
Algerian expatriate footballers
French expatriate footballers
Algerian expatriate sportspeople in Greece
French expatriate sportspeople in Germany
French expatriate sportspeople in Greece
Association football coaches
Algerian expatriate sportspeople in Belgium
French expatriate sportspeople in Romania
French expatriate sportspeople in Belgium